Körber, Korber or Koerber is a German  occupational surname for a basket maker. Notable people with the surname include:

Bette Korber, American biologist
Carsten Körber (born 1979), German politician
Claudius Körber (born 1982), German actor
Dorothy Korber, American journalist
Hilde Körber (1906–1969), Austrian actress
Eberhard von Koerber (1938–2017), German businessman
Ernest von Koerber (1850–1919), Austrian politician and nobleman
Gustav Wilhelm Körber (1817–1885), German lichenologist 
Kurt A. Körber (1909–1992), German businessman
Leonid Lwowitsch Körber
Leila Marie Koerber (1868–1934), birth name of Canadian actress and comedian Marie Dressler
Martin Körber (1817–1893), Baltic German writer, composer, and pastor 
Rick Koerber (born 1973 as Claud Franklin), American businessman and criminal
Serge Korber (born 1936), French film director

See also
Kerber (surname)

German-language surnames
Occupational surnames